Ingenia is a genus of marine nematode worms native to Brazil, with a single known species, I. mirabilis. It belongs to the Tripyloididae, which is a group that are mostly free-living and which feed on diatoms and other algaes.

References 

Enoplea genera